Tangerine is the third album by the American rock band Vixen. It was recorded without contributions from Jan Kuehnemund and Share Pederson. The line-up for this album consisted of Janet Gardner, Gina Stile, and Roxy Petrucci. Tangerine has a different sound from the music of the previous albums of the band, more similar to post-grunge than glam metal. This is the only album to have Stile as Vixen guitarist and the final studio release to feature Gardner as vocalist-guitarist during their tenures in the band; they were forced to part ways following the Tangerine tour for legal reasons as the courts found Kuehnemund to be the sole owner of the band name thereby making this release unrecognized and unofficial.

Stile and Gardner later rejoined Vixen in 2013, along with Ross and Petrucci, after playing as the former JanetShareRoxyGina (JSRG) line-up. Stile and Gardner left the band for good in 2017 and 2019, respectively.

Track listing

Personnel
Vixen
Janet Gardner - lead vocals, rhythm guitar
Gina Stile - lead and rhythm guitar, backing vocals
Roxy Petrucci - drums, backing vocals

Additional musicians
Mike Pisculli - bass

Production
Andy Katz, Phil Magnotti - engineers, mixing
Darrin Schneider - engineer
Ed Stasium - mixing
Greg Calbi - mastering at Masterdisk, New York

References

Vixen (band) albums
1998 albums
CMC International albums
Eagle Records albums
Post-grunge albums by American artists